Homoiodoris is a genus of sea slugs, dorid nudibranchs, shell-less marine gastropod mollusks in the family Dorididae.

This is a nomen dubium.

Species 
Species in the genus Homoiodoris include:
 Homoiodoris japonica  Bergh, 1882

References

Dorididae